Gretchen Magers and Robin White were the defending champions, but none competed this year.

Elena Brioukhovets and Natalia Medvedeva won the title by defeating Isabelle Demongeot and Jo Durie 7–5, 6–3 in the final.

Seeds

Draw

Draw

References

External links
 ITF tournament profile

St. Petersburg \Open
Moscow Ladies Open
September 1991 sports events in Russia